Feronia may mean:

 Feronia (mythology), a goddess of fertility in Roman and Etruscan mythology
 Feronia (plant), a genus of plants
 Feronia Inc., a plantations company operating in the Democratic Republic of the Congo
 Feronia (Sardinia), a mysterious ancient site in Sardinia, Italy
 Feronia (Etruria), a city in ancient Etruria, Italy
 72 Feronia, an asteroid